Sir Muhammad Saleh Akbar Hydari KCIE, CSI (12 October 1894 – 28 December 1948) was an Indian civil servant and politician. He was the last British-appointed Governor of the province of Assam, who also continued in the role after Indian independence.

Early life

Hydari was born to Amina and Sir Akbar Hydari, a Sulaimani Bohra Muslim family, on 12 October 1894. He was one of seven children. The lawyer and eminent Congressman Badruddin Tyabji was his granduncle. He completed his studies in Bombay and Oxford and entered the Indian civil service in 1919 beginning his career in the Madras Presidency.

Career

In June 1924, Hydari was appointed the undersecretary in the Department of Education, Health and Lands of the imperial government. He then served as Agent to the Governor of Ceylon from October 1927 to June 1929 dealing with welfare and rights of the large Indian labour force in the plantations. After the creation of Imperial Council of Agricultural Research in 1929, he became its secretary.

Hydari, in the position of joint secretary to the delegation from the Indian states first and later as Adviser to the delegation from Hyderabad State led by his father, visited London for the Round Table Conferences. Speaking at the second Conference on the State's behalf, he called for "work[ing] in harmony ... for the Greater and United India". On the discussions that followed the second Conference, he was a member of the Federal Finance Committee and the Consultative Committee.

Subsequently, Hydari returned to the Department of Education, Health and Lands as its joint secretary and then served as secretary of the Labour Department. During the early stages of World War II, he represented India on the Eastern Group Supply Council, a body set up to co-ordinate the build-up of supplies in the British colonies and dominions east of Suez. He was then placed on special duty in the Foreign Affairs Department. In 1945, he was appointed a member of the Viceroy's Executive Council and was given the charge of Information and Broadcasting Department.

Upon the formation of an interim government in 1946, Hydari was given the charge of labour, works, mines, power, information and arts, and health. In January 1947, his appointment as the Governor of Assam was approved by King George VI, and he was to take office in May after the completion of Sir Andrew Gourlay Clow's term. He took office on 4 May and he continued to hold the post following independence. With the Naga movement on during the time, in its demand for an independent State, Hydari signed a nine-point agreement with Naga National Convention in June.

Personal life

Hydari married Sigrid Westling, a Swedish woman, and they had three children together: son and namesake Akbar Hydari III (1919–1998) and two daughters. His son Hydari served as the Chairman of Western India Match Company (WIMCO) Ltd. from 1964 till the 1980s, later, the Director of Facit Asia and Honorary Swedish Consul in Madras.

Hydari died from a stroke at 6:30 p.m. Serving as the Governor of Assam during the time, he was on a tour of Manipur with his wife and son; his tribal adviser N. K. Rustomjee and military secretary Major Dhamija. Starting 3 p.m. (IST) on 29 December, his body, in a coffin draped in the National and Governor's flag, was carried in a procession led by a contingent of Assam Rifles to the cemetery in the Imphal Cantonment and was buried at 4 p.m. (IST). The cemetery is housed in the Kangla Palace. A three-day mourning was observed in Manipur. In an obituary, The Gazette of India wrote, "Sir Akbar will be remembered above all for the remarkable catholicity of his religious outlook and his genius for friendship. In this he maintained the distinguished record of his illustrious father."

References

1894 births
1948 deaths
Knights Commander of the Order of the Indian Empire
Companions of the Order of the Star of India
Indian knights
Indian Muslims
Governors of Assam
Indian Civil Service (British India) officers
Sulaymani Bohras
Indian Ismailis
Tyabji family